Rewired State was an organisation which ran a series of hack days for programmers and designers, focused on improving access to UK government open data and encouraging innovation in government services.

Rewired State was founded by James Darling, Emma Mulqueeny, and Richard Pope in 2008. The first event, National Hack the Government Day, was held on March 7, 2009 at the Guardian offices in King's Cross, London. Over 80 people attended producing over 30 hacks. Judges at Rewired State events included Tom Watson MP and Dr Sue Black. Sponsors included the Government Digital Service, mySociety, and Nesta. National Hack the Government Day ran annually until 2015.

Parliament Hack 

Between 2011 and 2013, Rewired State ran a series of Parliament Hack events in association with the UK Parliament, with the aim to build new apps using parliamentary data.

Young Rewired State 

Rewired State formed a sister organisation, Young Rewired State, to bring young developers together to solve real world problems. Young Rewired State ran its own series of Festival of Code hack days between 2009 and 2015.

Other Events 
Rewired State also ran a number of other government data hack days including Rewired State: Culture, (H)activate,  Middle East Hack, Follow the Data, and Carbon and Energy Hack Weekend.

Last Event and Closure 
National Hack the Government Day and other events ran annually until the last event in 2015. Between 2015 and 2016, Rewired State was run as a consultancy business by Emma Mulqueeny. The company was dissolved in 2018.

References 

Computing and society
Software development events